Indestructible Object is the title of a They Might Be Giants EP, released April 6, 2004 (see 2004 in music) by Barsuk Records. The title comes from a famous work by Man Ray, also known as Object to Be Destroyed. The track "Memo to Human Resources" and a different version of "Au Contraire" went on to be featured on their full-length album released in the same year, The Spine. "Am I Awake?" was used as the theme song for the TLC series Resident Life. The track "Ant" is a re-recording of a B-side from two of their 1990 singles ("Istanbul (Not Constantinople)" and "Birdhouse in Your Soul"). "Caroline, No" is a cover of a Beach Boys song from their 1966 album Pet Sounds.

Track listing
All songs written by They Might Be Giants, except "Caroline, No" by Brian Wilson and Tony Asher.

External links
Indestructible Object on This Might Be A Wiki

2004 EPs
They Might Be Giants EPs
Barsuk Records EPs